The Bandhan Express train is an international express rail service which runs between the Indian city Kolkata and the Bangladeshi city Khulna every week. It is the second modern day, fully air conditioned passenger train link between the Indian state West Bengal and Bangladesh. The Bengali word Bandhan means bonding when translated to English. It was initially referred to as the Maitree Express II. A valid visa and passport is required before purchasing a ticket for the Bandhan Express train. Tickets are available at Khulna railway station in Bangladesh and at Chitpur Station in Kolkata, India.

The commercial run of this train was suspended in the wake of the global COVID-19 pandemic since March 2020. However, the train resumed its normal operations from 29 May 2022. Together with the Maitree Express train and the Mitali Express train, the Bandhan Express train is one of three modern day fully air conditioned passenger train links between the India and Bangladesh.

History

Naming 
After the Kolkata–Dhaka Maitree Express train was operational, it was proposed to name this second India–Bangladesh train on the Kolkata–Khulna route as 'Sonartari'. But the same name is used in the railways and trains of both countries and hence it was omitted. Then the names Sampritee and Bandhan were offered. Finally the name Bandhan meaning Bonding was unanimously accepted.

Route
The route recreates the previous Barisal Express route. The train starts at Kolkata railway station on the Indian side, stopping at Dum Dum and Bangaon before reaching the Indian border at Petrapole. The train then crosses to Benapole on the Bangladeshi side, going through Jhikargachha & Jessore, before reaching Khulna railway station. There are no immigration or customs checks at the international border between India and Bangladesh for this train. The immigration process is done in Kolkata and Khulna. A valid visa and passport is required before purchasing a ticket for the Bandhan Express train. Tickets are available at Khulna Railway Station in Bangladesh and at Chitpur Station in Kolkata, India.

On 8 March 2019 both Government agreed to make a 3-minute halt at Jessore in order to attract more passengers and 200 tickets are reserved for the passengers from Jessore station.

Timings and frequency
Since its inauguration, the train run only on Thursday but in February 2020, the frequency was increased and now the train runs twice in a week (i.e. Sunday and Thursday).

Coach composition
Pure LHB coach in red-grey (used by Rajdhani Expresses) and sky blue-grey (used by Shatabdi Expresses) manufactured in India, are used for this train. 
 It comprises 4 Executive Chair (EC), 4 AC Chair car (CC) and 2 Generator cum luggage cum guard van, hence, a total of 10 coaches.

Legends

 Rake composition of 13129 down Kolkata to Khulna

 while 13130 up Khulna to Kolkata has reverse rake composition of 13130

Gallery

See also
 Maitree Express
 Mitali Express
 Samjhauta Express
 Transport between India and Bangladesh#Rail links

References

External links

 Bangladesh Railway

Benapole
Petrapole
Named passenger trains of India
Named passenger trains of Bangladesh
International named passenger trains
Transport in Kolkata
Bangladesh–India relations
Rail transport in West Bengal
Transport in Khulna